Walter Joseph Kellner (April 26, 1929 – June 19, 2006) was an American relief pitcher in Major League Baseball who had an eight-year professional career, and played three games in the Major Leagues for the Philadelphia Athletics between  and .

He started out with Lincoln in the Western League, winning three games and losing fourteen in his first pro season. In his very first game, he picked up a save, facing 19 batters over four innings pitched and giving up four hits and three runs. He played two more games the following year, allowing one hit and two runs over three innings.

He died in his hometown of Tucson, Arizona, on June 19, 2006.

Family
The last of three sons (four children) of John Justus and Julietta (Garcia) Kellner, in Tucson, Arizona. His paternal great-grandfather, Johann Justus Kellner, a German immigrant, had arrived in central Texas in 1845. His older brother, Alex, also was a major league pitcher. The two were teammates in 1952 and 1953.

References

Obituary, Sports Collectors Digest, Krause Publications, November 10, 2006.
Baseball Almanac
Historic Baseball

Specific

1929 births
2006 deaths
American people of German descent
Arizona Wildcats baseball players
Baseball players from Tucson, Arizona
Columbus Jets players
Denver Bears players
Lincoln A's players
Major League Baseball pitchers
Mobile Bears players
New Orleans Pelicans (baseball) players
Oklahoma City Indians players
Ottawa A's players
Philadelphia Athletics players
Reading Indians players
San Antonio Missions players
Savannah A's players
Williamsport A's players